Méléagre (Meleager) is an opera by the French-Italian composer Jean-Baptiste Stuck, first performed at the Académie Royale de Musique (the Paris Opera) on 24 May 1709. It takes the form of a tragédie en musique in a prologue and five acts. The libretto, by François-Antoine Jolly, is based on the Greek legend of Meleager.

Sources 
 Libretto at "Livrets baroques"
 Félix Clément and Pierre Larousse Dictionnaire des Opéras, Paris, 1881, page 448.

French-language operas
Tragédies en musique
Operas by Jean-Baptiste Stuck
Operas
1709 operas